This is a list of Telangana's monuments of national importance as officially recognized by and available through the website of the Archaeological Survey of India (ASI). These archaeological sites are in the Indian state of Telangana; however, the published list has not been updated since the creation of Telangana in 2014. Here the list has been renumbered for Telangana, with eight monuments of national importance having been recognized by the ASI.

, no monuments have been recognised from the districts of Adilabad, Karimnagar, Nalgonda, Nizamabad, and Ranga Reddy.

List of monuments 

|}

See also 
 List of Monuments of National Importance in India for the lists for other states
 List of State Protected Monuments in Telangana
 List of state protected Monuments in Andhra Pradesh

Notes and references 

Telangana, List of Monuments of National Importance
Monuments of National Importance in Telangana
Monuments and memorials in Telangana
Lists of tourist attractions in Telangana